Johann Theodor Mosewius also Johann Theodor Mosevius (birth name "Moses") (25 September 1788 – 15. September 1858) was a German operatic bass, choirmaster and music director of the University of Wroclaw.

Life 
Mosewius was born in Königsberg. After studying law, he trained as an opera singer (bass) and worked as such at the local theatre, at the time of the management of August von Kotzebue (1814-1816), then he moved to Breslau, where he worked as a singer and actor until his quarrel with the theatre tenant Gottlob Benedict Bierey and the death of his wife.

Following the example of Carl Friedrich Zelter and his Sing-Akademie zu Berlin, Mosewius founded such an institute in 1825 in Breslau, too, with 26 members at first. Just six months later, the choir performed Handels' oratorium Samson under his direction.

One year after Mendelssohn's revival of Bach's St Matthew Passion in Berlin, Mosewius rehearsed it in Breslau in 1830 with overwhelming success. As a conductor and researcher, he took on the task of popularising Bach, and Breslau became one of the most important centres of Bach cultivation until 1945.

After the foundation of the academy of music, which partly existed at the same time as the Breslauer Liedertafel, he became a singing teacher or university music director (1827/1832), director of the academic institute for church music (1831), and founder of the musical circle for the performance of sacred music (1834). The Institute performed Italian oratorios as well as those by Mendelssohn, Carl Loewe, Louis Spohr, Adolf Bernhard Marx and others. In Breslau he joined the masonic lodge "Friedrich zum goldenen Zepter".

Shortly after his departure from the Wroclaw theatre on 16 December 1825, Mosewius performed for the first time parts of Schubert's Lieder cycle Die schöne Müllerin as part of an evening musical entertainment in the Wroclaw "great provincial resource".

Mosewius achieved international recognition through his activities and writings, and even during his time at the theatre, he always sought close contact with influential journalists (in Breslau, for example Karl Schall).

From 1810 Mosewius was married with the singer Sophie Wilhelmine, née Müller (1792-1825), who made her debut in Berlin 1805 and afterwards got a job in Königsberg. From 1810 to 1812, she stayed in Berlin and from 1816 she was engaged in Breslau.

His nickname as a foreign member of the Vienna literary society Ludlamshöhle was "Sebastiano da Solfeggio".

Mosewius died in Schaffhausen at the age of 69.

Publications 
 Michael Heinemann (ed.): Johann Theodor Mosewius: Johann Sebastian Bachs Matthäus-Passion, musikalisch aesthetisch dargestellt. (Beigebunden: Johann Sebastian Bach in seinen Kirchen-Cantaten und Choralgesängen.) Reprint of the 1845/52 edition, Hildesheim 2001.
 Johann Sebastian Bach in seinen Kirchen-Cantaten und Choralgesängen, dargestellt von Johann Theodor Mosewius.

Further reading 
 
 Carl Julius Adolph Hoffmann (ed.): Die Tonkünstler Schlesiens. Breslau 1830.
 Denkschrift zur Erinnerung an Bierey und seine Verwaltung des Breslauer Theaters bei Eröffnung des neuen Schauspielhauses zu Breslau im October des Jahres 1841.
 Anonymus (Ernst Friedrich Baumgart oder Anna Kempe): Erinnerungen an Ernst Theodor Mosewius. Breslau 1859. google books
 Verzeichnis von Musikalien aus dem Nachlaß des verstorbenen Herrn Dr. J. Th. Mosewius und Musikalische Bibliothek enthaltend die nachgelassene Büchersammlung des Herrn Dr. Johann Theodor Mosewius. Breslau o. J. [ca. 1860].
 Lothar Hoffmann-Erbrecht: Die Anfänge der Breslauer Singakademie unter Johann Theodor Mosewius. In Wolf Frobenius among others (ed.): Akademie und Musik …: Festschrift für Werner Braun. Saarbrücken 1993, .
 Till Gerrit Waidelich: "Torupson" und Franz von Schober – Leben und Wirken des von Frauen, Freunden und Biographen umworbenen Schubert- und Schwind-Freundes, in Schubert: Perspektiven 6 (2006), issues 1 and 2 – Sonderheft, .  (Plus table of contents and index of persons, in Schubert: Perspektiven 7 (2007)). Contains information about Mosewius as a theatre singer and a portrait of the young Mosewius .

References

External links 
 

German operatic basses
German Freemasons
1788 births
1858 deaths
Musicians from Königsberg
19th-century German male opera singers